Organisations which have adopted the name Proletarian University'' include:

 Vpered, a grouping within the Bolshevik Party set up a prototype Proletarian University on the Isle of Capri in 1908.
 Proletkult was involved in setting up the Proletarian University''' in Russia in 1918.
 Proletarian Party of America was involved in the Proletarian University set up in Detroit.